Bhavnagar railway station is a small railway station in Bhavnagar district, Gujarat. Its code is BVP. It serves Bhavnagar city. The station consists of two platforms. The platforms are not well sheltered. It lacks many facilities including water and sanitation.

Trains 
Some of the trains that run from Bhavnagar Para are:

 Bhavnagar-Kochuveli SF express
 Bandra Terminus–Bhavnagar Superfast Express
 Okha–Bhavnagar Passenger
 Mahuva–Bhavnagar Passenger
 Palitana–Bhavnagar Passenger
 Surendranagar–Bhavnagar Fast Passenger
 Bhavnagar–Botad Passenger

References

Railway stations in Bhavnagar district
Bhavnagar railway division
Railway stations in India opened in 1880